Great Oil Spill of 2010 may refer to:

 Deepwater Horizon oil spill
Great Barrier Reef oil spill